The following lists events that happened during 1974 in Cape Verde.

Incumbents
Colonial governor:
António Adriano Faria Lopes dos Santos
Henrique da Silva Horta
Vicente Almeida d'Eça
High commissioner: Vicente Almeida d'Eça

Events
April 25: the Carnation Revolution took place in Portugal, the Estado Novo regime collapsed, Cape Verde became an autonomous province
April 26: In the evening, all prisoners from the Tarrafal Camp were released
September 24: African Youth Amílcar Cabral founded, since 1991, it is now the Youth of PAICV
October 13: politician Pedro Pires returned to Praia after being exiled

Arts and entertainment
Orlanda Amarílis' short story book Cais-do-Sodré té Salamansa was published

Sports
CD Travadores won the Cape Verdean Football Championship

Births
March 27: Manuel dos Santos Fernandes, footballer
April 1: Maria Martins, athlete
October 25: Gil Semedo, singer
December 7: Louisa da Conceição, basketball player

References

 
1974 in the Portuguese Empire
Years of the 20th century in Cape Verde
1970s in Cape Verde
Cape Verde
Cape Verde